William Richard Griffin (September 1, 1882 – March 18, 1944) was an American prelate of the Roman Catholic Church who served as auxiliary bishop of the Diocese of La Crosse, Wisconsin.

Biography
Griffin born in Chicago, Illinois. He was ordained to the Roman Catholic priesthood on May 25, 1907, for the Archdiocese of Chicago.

On March 9, 1935, he was appointed auxiliary bishop for the Diocese of La Crosse and titular bishop of Lydda. He was consecrated as bishop on May 1, 1935.

On January 24, 1943, the future Bishop John Joseph Paul was ordained to the Roman Catholic priesthood by Bishop Griffin at St. Rose of Viterbo Convent in La Crosse, the motherhouse of the Franciscan Sisters of Perpetual Adoration.

Bishop Griffin died in La Crosse, Wisconsin, and was buried in Calvary Cemetery, Chicago.

References

External links

1882 births
1944 deaths
Clergy from Chicago
Roman Catholic Archdiocese of Chicago
People from La Crosse, Wisconsin
20th-century Roman Catholic bishops in the United States
Roman Catholic Diocese of La Crosse
Religious leaders from Illinois
Catholics from Illinois
Catholics from Wisconsin